Country Lads is a 1941 New Zealand patriotic propaganda film. It was produced by the National Film Unit for the  New Zealand war effort.

Synopsis
Adolf Hitler referred to New Zealand soldiers as 'poor, deluded country lads'. This film shows the pride of Kiwi troops, and emphasising ordinary men and women from all walks of life taking up the call serve. 'Country Lads' shows the impact of war on the society of New Zealand in the 1940s. The dockside goodbyes to loved ones are still poignant today.

Production
This was the first production released by the newly reorganised National Film Unit.

Reviews
1995 featured in New Zealand's contribution to the British Film Institute's Century of Cinema series - Cinema of Unease: A Personal Journey by Sam Neill.

References

External links
Country Lads Youtube

1941 films
1940s New Zealand films
1940s English-language films
National Film Unit
1940s short documentary films
1941 in New Zealand
Black-and-white documentary films
Films set in New Zealand
New Zealand short documentary films